Martina Bárta (born 1 September 1988) is a Czech jazz singer and musician. A vocalist and a French horn player, she was part of the Frankfurt am Main-based jazz band 4 To The Bar. She also had a role in the musical Robin Hood and worked with Felix Slováček and Karel Gott.

She represented the Czech Republic in the Eurovision Song Contest 2017 with the song My Turn but failed to qualify to the final. In 2018, she took part in Deutschland sucht den Superstar and reached the recall.

Discography

Singles

References

1988 births
Czech expatriates in Germany
21st-century Czech women singers
Czech jazz singers
Living people
Eurovision Song Contest entrants for the Czech Republic
Eurovision Song Contest entrants of 2017
Musicians from Prague